Tangstad is a village in Vestvågøy Municipality in Nordland county, Norway.

References

Vestvågøy
Villages in Nordland